Professor Urban Chronotis is a fictional character created by Douglas Adams. He was originally created for the 1979 Doctor Who serial Shada, starring Tom Baker and Lalla Ward. However, the filming of the serial was never completed due to a strike.  Adams then re-used the character and many of the themes from Shada in his novel Dirk Gently's Holistic Detective Agency, first published in 1987.  In both versions, Chronotis is a clandestine time-traveller, whose time machine (or TARDIS, as they are termed in Doctor Who) is disguised as his college rooms.

Shada
In 1992, Shada was completed through the use of linking narration by Tom Baker and released on home video.  In this version, the character was played by Denis Carey.

In 2003, Shada was remade as an animated webcast by Big Finish Productions for the BBC. Professor Chronotis was played by James Fox in this version, which was also released as an audio play on CD.

Chronotis holds the post of Regius Professor of Chronology at Cambridge University. He is also a Fellow of the fictional St. Cedd's College, Cambridge, where he has resided for three centuries. In Shada, Chronotis is a retired Time Lord and old friend of the Doctor, living out his remaining centuries in academic seclusion. His unnaturally long life goes un-discussed by his colleagues, owing to the discretion he claims is a hallmark of the old Cambridge colleges. Owing to repeated time travel and advanced age, he is extremely forgetful and absent-minded. He often does not remember which time period he has travelled nor the reason why. Among other things, he has a liking for tea and silly jokes. It is also revealed during the course of Shada that Chronotis was a Time Lord criminal named Salyavin, who was falsely imprisoned on and escaped from the prison planetoid Shada.

Despite his being innocent, the Time Lords attempted to imprison Salyavin in Shada for fear of him using his unique mind powers to take over Gallifrey. Salyavin escaped by using his mind powers to control the guards escorting him. Salyavin escapes with his TARDIS, disguised as a bookmark. Shortly after escaping Shada, he used his powers to remove all memory of Shada from every Time Lord. In doing so, he is forced to regenerate, and take the name of Chronotis.

Dirk Gently
The Dirk Gently version of the character is almost identical to the Shada version, though the novel contains no references to Time Lords. Here Chronotis is so old and forgetful that he has no idea who or what he originally was, though he has vague memories of Cleopatra (who he claims wore outrageous earrings and reeked of cat food and death), and believes that he achieved his position after his retirement from "something pretty good". He is known as "Reg", short for Regius Professor Chronotis.

His Chair of Chronology was created by mad king George III who was terrified that if time were to start flowing backwards, all the bad experiences of his life might recur. In fact, central to the book's theme are the three questions the King asked Reg upon his appointment: if one could travel through time, if there was a reason one thing happened after another, and if there was any way of stopping it (the answers are, in order, yes, no and maybe), Reg apparently promptly realising the answer to the three questions and concluding that he could then take time off in reasonable comfort. However, at the conclusion of the novel his time machine was burned out when the phone repair man fixed Reg's telephone so that it would never go wrong again; for some reason the phone always malfunctioned whenever Reg used the time machine due to there being something fundamentally inexplicable about the British telephone system.

In 2007, Dirk Gently's Holistic Detective Agency was adapted to radio and Professor Chronotis was portrayed by Andrew Sachs (who had previously played Skagra in the Big Finish audio/BBC webcast version of Shada).

References

External links

Television characters introduced in 1980
Fictional professors
Time Lords
Doctor Who audio characters
Fictional University of Cambridge people
Dirk Gently
Douglas Adams characters
Male characters in literature
Male characters in television